RRS Discovery is a wooden three-masted British ship launched in 1901, and is most associated with the Discovery Expedition to the Antarctic led by Robert Falcon Scott and Ernest Shackleton.

RRS Discovery may also refer to:
 RRS Discovery II, a British Royal Research Ship completed in 1929
 RRS Discovery (1962), a British Royal Research Ship launched in 1962
 RRS Discovery (2013), a Royal Research Ship completed in 2013